Upper Wield is a village in the East Hampshire district of Hampshire, England. It is in the civil parish of Wield.

The nearest railway station is the restored Medstead & Four Marks station on the Watercress Line, trains from which connect with the nearest national rail station  to the east, at Alton.

In January 2014 a whirl-wind blew away three farm buildings at Blackmoor Game

Further reading
 Anon A Brief History and Description of St. James Church, Wield (available from the church)

References

External links

 Hampshire Treasures Volume 6 (East Hampshire) Pages 321, 323, 324, 325, and 326

Villages in Hampshire